Erythrolamprus zweifeli, the braided ground snake or Zweifel's ground snake, is a species of snake in the family Colubridae. The species is found in Venezuela and Trinidad.

References

Erythrolamprus
Reptiles of Venezuela
Reptiles of Trinidad and Tobago
Reptiles described in 1959
Taxa named by Janis Roze